The Mayor of Bologna is an elected politician who, along with the Bologna’s City Council, is accountable for the strategic government of Bologna, the regional capital of Emilia-Romagna, Italy.

Overview
According to the Italian Constitution, the Mayor of Bologna is a member of the City Council.

The Mayor is elected by the population of Bologna, who also elects the members of the City Council, the legislative body which checks the Mayor's policy guidelines and is able to enforce his resignation by a motion of no confidence. The Mayor is entitled to appoint and release the members of his executive.

Since 1993 the Mayor is elected directly by Bologna's electorate: in all mayoral elections in Italy in cities with a population higher than 15,000 voters express a direct choice for the mayor or an indirect choice voting for the party of the candidate's coalition. If no candidate receives at least 50% of votes, the top two candidates go to a second round after two weeks. The election of the City Council is based on a direct choice for the candidate with a preference vote: the candidate with the majority of the preferences is elected. The number of the seats for each party is determined proportionally on the base of a majority bonus system.

List of Mayors of Bologna

Kingdom of Italy (1860-1946)
In 1860 the nascent Kingdom of Italy created the office of the Mayor of Bologna (Sindaco di Bologna), chosen by the City council.
In 1926, the Fascist dictatorship abolished mayors and City councils, replacing them with an authoritarian Podestà chosen by the National Fascist Party.

Republic of Italy (1946–present)
From 1945 to 1995, the Mayor of Bologna was chosen by the City council.
Since 1995, under provisions of new local administration law (1993), the Mayor of Bologna is chosen by direct election, originally every four years, and since 1999 every five years.

Notes

Timeline

By time in office

Elections

City Council elections, 1946–1990

Number of votes for each party:

Number of seats in the City Council for each party:

Mayoral and City Council election, 1995
The election took place on 23 April 1995.
 

|- 
|- style="background-color:#E9E9E9;text-align:center;"
! colspan="4" rowspan="1" style="text-align:left;" | Parties and coalitions
! colspan="1" | Votes
! colspan="1" | %
! colspan="1" | Seats
|-
| style="background-color:pink" rowspan="3" |
| style="background-color:" |
| style="text-align:left;" | Two Towers for Bologna (Due Torri per Bologna)
| PDS
| 104,276 || 38.65 || 22
|-
| style="background-color:orange" |
| style="text-align:left;" | Democrats for Bologna (Democratici per Bologna)
| PPI
| 17,049 || 6.32 || 3
|-
| style="background-color:" |
| style="text-align:left;" | Federation of the Greens (Federazione dei Verdi) 
| FdV
| 14,136 || 5.24 || 3
|- style="background-color:pink"
| style="text-align:left;" colspan="4" | Vitali coalition (Centre-left)
| 135,461 || 50.22 || 28
|-
| style="background-color:lightblue" rowspan="2" |
| style="background-color:" |
| style="text-align:left;" | National Alliance (Alleanza Nazionale)
| AN
| 46,840 || 17.36 || 7
|-
| style="background-color:blue" |
| style="text-align:left;" | Federalist Union (Unione Federalista) 
| UF
| 1,420 || 0.53 || 0
|- style="background-color:lightblue"
| colspan="4" style="text-align:left;" | Berselli coalition (Right-wing)
| 48,260 || 17.89 || 7
|-
| style="background-color:" |
| style="text-align:left;" colspan="2" | New Bologna (Bologna Nuova)
| FI
| 44,723 || 16.58 || 7
|-
| style="background-color:" |
| style="text-align:left;" colspan="2" | Communist Refoundation Party (Rifondazione Comunista)
| PRC
| 20,718 || 7.68 || 3
|-
| style="background-color:" |
| style="text-align:left;" colspan="2" | Others 
| 
| 20,600 || 7.63 || 1
|-
| colspan="7" style="background-color:#E9E9E9" | 
|- style="font-weight:bold;"
| style="text-align:left;" colspan="4" | Total
| 269,762 || 100.00 || 46
|-
| colspan="7" style="background-color:#E9E9E9" | 
|-
| style="text-align:left;" colspan="4" | Votes cast / turnout 
| 304,106 || 87.08 || style="background-color:#E9E9E9;" |
|-
| style="text-align:left;" colspan="4" | Registered voters
| 349,220 ||  || style="background-color:#E9E9E9;" |
|-
| colspan="7" style="background-color:#E9E9E9" | 
|-
| style="text-align:left;" colspan="7" | Source: Ministry of the Interior
|}

Mayoral and City Council election, 1999
The election took place on two rounds: the first on 13 June, the second on 27 June 1999.

|- 
|- style="background-color:#E9E9E9;text-align:center;"
! colspan="4" rowspan="1" style="text-align:left;" | Parties and coalitions
! colspan="1" | Votes
! colspan="1" | %
! colspan="1" | Seats
|-
| style="background-color:pink" rowspan="6" |
| style="background-color:" |
| style="text-align:left;" | For Bologna (Per Bologna)
| DS
| 57,263 || 25.36 || 11
|-
| style="background-color:" |
| style="text-align:left;" | The Democrats (I Democratici)
| Dem
| 26,036 || 11.53 || 4
|-
| style="background-color:" |
| style="text-align:left;" | Party of Italian Communists (Partito dei Comunisti Italiani)
| PdCI
| 8,789 || 3.89 || 1
|-
| style="background-color:" |
| style="text-align:left;" | Federation of the Greens (Federazione dei Verdi)
| FdV
| 5,762 || 2.55 || 1
|-
| style="background-color:" |
| style="text-align:left;" | Italian People's Party (Partito Popolare Italiano)
| PPI
| 3,863 || 1.71 || 0
|-
| style="background-color:purple" |
| style="text-align:left;" | Italian Democratic Socialists (Socialisti Democratici Italiani)
| SDI
| 3,303 || 1.46 || 0
|- style="background-color:pink"
| style="text-align:left;" colspan="4" | Bartolini coalition (Centre-left)
| 105,016 || 46.50 || 17
|-
| style="background-color:lightblue" rowspan="4" |
| style="background-color:orange" |
| style="text-align:left;" | Your Bologna (La Tua Bologna)
| 
| 35,125 || 15.55 || 11
|-
| style="background-color:" |
| style="text-align:left;" | Forza Italia 
| FI
| 25,890 || 11.46 || 8
|-
| style="background-color:" |
| style="text-align:left;" | National Alliance (Alleanza Nazionale)
| AN
| 24,742 || 10.96 || 7
|-
| style="background-color:blue" |
| style="text-align:left;" | To Govern Bologna (Governare Bologna)
| 
| 6,737 || 2.98 || 2
|- style="background-color:lightblue"
| colspan="4" style="text-align:left;" | Guazzaloca coalition (Centre-right)
| 92,494 || 40.96 || 28
|-
| style="background-color:" |
| style="text-align:left;" colspan="2" | Communist Refoundation Party (Rifondazione Comunista)
| PRC
| 11,223 || 4.97 || 1
|-
| style="background-color:" |
| style="text-align:left;" colspan="2" | Others 
| 
| 17,100 || 7.57 || 0
|-
| colspan="7" style="background-color:#E9E9E9" | 
|- style="font-weight:bold;"
| style="text-align:left;" colspan="4" | Total
| 225,833 || 100.00 || 46
|-
| colspan="7" style="background-color:#E9E9E9" | 
|-
| style="text-align:left;" colspan="4" | Votes cast / turnout 
| 265,816 || 78.85 || style="background-color:#E9E9E9;" |
|-
| style="text-align:left;" colspan="4" | Registered voters
| 337,097 ||  || style="background-color:#E9E9E9;" |
|-
| colspan="7" style="background-color:#E9E9E9" | 
|-
| style="text-align:left;" colspan="7" | Source: Ministry of the Interior
|}

Notes

Mayoral and City Council election, 2004
The election took place on 12–13 June 2004.

|- 
|- style="background-color:#E9E9E9;text-align:center;"
! colspan="4" rowspan="1" style="text-align:left;" | Parties and coalitions
! colspan="1" | Votes
! colspan="1" | %
! colspan="1" | Seats
|-
| style="background-color:pink" rowspan="6" |
| style="background-color:" |
| style="text-align:left;" | Democrats of the Left (Democratici di Sinistra)
| DS
| 80,477 || 36.54 || 20
|-
| style="background-color:" |
| style="text-align:left;" | The Daisy (La Margherita)
| DL
| 15,218 || 6.91 || 3
|-
| style="background-color:" |
| style="text-align:left;" | Federation of the Greens (Federazione dei Verdi)
| FdV
| 11,418 || 5.18 || 2
|-
| style="background-color:" |
| style="text-align:left;" | Communist Refoundation Party (Rifondazione Comunista)
| PRC
| 10,216 || 4.64 || 2
|-
| style="background-color:" |
| style="text-align:left;" | Italy of Values (Italia dei Valori)
| IdV
| 4,653 || 2.11 || 1
|-
| style="background-color:" |
| style="text-align:left;" | Others
| 
| 4,566 || 2.07 || 0
|- style="background-color:pink"
| style="text-align:left;" colspan="4" | Cofferati coalition (Centre-left)
| 126,548 || 57.46 || 28
|-
| style="background-color:lightblue" rowspan="4" |
| style="background-color:orange" |
| style="text-align:left;" | Your Bologna (La Tua Bologna)
| 
| 40,429 || 18.36 || 9
|-
| style="background-color:" |
| style="text-align:left;" | Forza Italia 
| FI
| 24,315 || 11.04 || 5
|-
| style="background-color:" |
| style="text-align:left;" | National Alliance (Alleanza Nazionale)
| AN
| 18,803 || 8.54 || 4
|-
| style="background-color:blue" |
| style="text-align:left;" | To Govern Bologna (Governare Bologna)
| 
| 1,268 || 0.58 || 0
|- style="background-color:lightblue"
| colspan="4" style="text-align:left;" | Guazzaloca coalition (Centre-right)
| 84,815 || 38.51 || 18
|-
| style="background-color:" |
| style="text-align:left;" colspan="2" | Others 
| 
| 8,888 || 4.03 || 0
|-
| colspan="7" style="background-color:#E9E9E9" | 
|- style="font-weight:bold;"
| style="text-align:left;" colspan="4" | Total
| 220,251 || 100.00 || 46
|-
| colspan="7" style="background-color:#E9E9E9" | 
|-
| style="text-align:left;" colspan="4" | Votes cast / turnout 
| 261,392 || 81.81 || style="background-color:#E9E9E9;" |
|-
| style="text-align:left;" colspan="4" | Registered voters
| 337,097 ||  || style="background-color:#E9E9E9;" |
|-
| colspan="7" style="background-color:#E9E9E9" | 
|-
| style="text-align:left;" colspan="7" | Source: Ministry of the Interior
|}

Notes

Mayoral and City Council election, 2009

The election took place in two rounds: the first on 6–7 June, the second on 21–22 June 2009.

Mayoral and City Council election, 2011

The election took place on 15–16 May 2011.

Mayoral and City Council election, 2016

The election took place in two rounds: the first on 5 June, the second on 19 June 2016.

Mayoral and City Council election, 2021

The election took place on 3–4 October 2021.

See also
 Timeline of Bologna

References

Bologna